Acemya fishelsoni is a species of bristle fly in the family Tachinidae.

Distribution
China, Israel, Mongolia, Yemen.

References

Exoristinae
Diptera of Asia
Insects described in 1968